Pennsylvania State Senate District 11 includes parts of Berks County. It is currently represented by Democrat Judy Schwank.

District profile
The district includes the following areas:

 Adamstown (Berks County portion)
 Alsace Township
 Cumru Township
 Exeter Township
 Fleetwood
 Kenhorst
 Kutztown
 Laureldale
 Lower Alsace Township
 Lyons
 Maxatawny Township
 Mohnton
 Mount Penn
 Muhlenberg Township
 Oley Township
 Reading
 Richmond Township
 Ruscombmanor Township
 Shillington
 Sinking Spring
 Spring Township
 St. Lawrence
 West Reading
 Wyomissing

Senators

Recent election results

References

Pennsylvania Senate districts
Government of Berks County, Pennsylvania